MSCL may refer to:
 Marine Services Company Limited, a passenger and cargo shipping company in Tanzania
 My So-Called Life, an American television teen drama
 Moscow Student Conference on Linguistics, an international linguistic conference for young researchers
 Methanesulfonyl chloride, an Organic Compound with the chemical formula CH3ClO2S.